In the 2022–23 season, ES Sétif are competing in the Ligue 1 for the 53rd season and the Algerian Cup. It is their 21st consecutive season in the top flight of Algerian football. They are competing in Ligue 1.

Season summary
ES Sétif has revealed that it has received an offer from a large Qatari company wishing to buy part of the Algerian club, In a statement posted on the Entente's Facebook page, management said it had "received official correspondence from one of the main Qatari companies (LOI) confirming its intention to buy part of the club's shares from ES Setif". Without disclosing the name of the said suitor. In addition the company wishes to make an initial investment in various infrastructure and development projects in Algeria. On March 6, 2023 the general manager of the company ESS Black Eagles Brahim El Arbaoui indicated that the administration of the club, represented by the chairman of the board of directors Abdelhakim Serrar, will officially enter into negotiations with the Sonelgaz on the possible takeover by this group of the majority of the club's shares.

Squad list
Players and squad numbers last updated on 5 February 2023.Note: Flags indicate national team as has been defined under FIFA eligibility rules. Players may hold more than one non-FIFA nationality.

Competitions

Overview

{| class="wikitable" style="text-align: center"
|-
!rowspan=2|Competition
!colspan=8|Record
!rowspan=2|Started round
!rowspan=2|Final position / round
!rowspan=2|First match
!rowspan=2|Last match
|-
!
!
!
!
!
!
!
!
|-
| Ligue 1

|  
| To be confirmed
| 27 August 2022
| In Progress
|-
| Algerian Cup

| Round of 64 
| Round of 32 
| 20 December 2022
| 14 February 2023
|-
! Total

Ligue 1

League table

Results summary

Results by round

Matches
The league fixtures were announced on 19 July 2022.

Algerian Cup

Squad information

Playing statistics

|-
! colspan=10 style=background:#dcdcdc; text-align:center| Goalkeepers

|-
! colspan=10 style=background:#dcdcdc; text-align:center| Defenders

|-
! colspan=10 style=background:#dcdcdc; text-align:center| Midfielders

|-
! colspan=10 style=background:#dcdcdc; text-align:center| Forwards

|-
! colspan=12 style=background:#dcdcdc; text-align:center| Players transferred out during the season

Goalscorers

Includes all competitive matches. The list is sorted alphabetically by surname when total goals are equal.

Transfers

In

Summer

Winter

Out

Summer

Winter

Notes

References

2022-23
Algerian football clubs 2022–23 season